Joffre is a hamlet in central Alberta, Canada within Lacombe County.

Demographics 

History 
The community name was originally a Post Office named in 1918 after Marshal J. J. C. Joffre, Commander-in-Chief of the Allied army 1915–1917. Previously it had been named "Blades" after a local family of pioneers.

See also 
List of communities in Alberta
List of designated places in Alberta
List of hamlets in Alberta

References 

Hamlets in Alberta
Designated places in Alberta
Lacombe County